Zeocin is a trade name for a formulation of phleomycin D1, a glycopeptide antibiotic and one of the phleomycins from Streptomyces verticillus belonging to the bleomycin family of antibiotics.  It is a  broad-spectrum antibiotic that is effective against most aerobic organisms including bacteria, filamentous fungi, yeast, plant, and animal cells.  It causes cell death by intercalating into DNA and inducing double stranded breaks of the DNA.

Zeocin is a registered trademark belonging to InvivoGen.

Properties
Zeocin is blue in colour due to the presence of copper ion Cu2+.  This copper-chelated form is inactive.  When Zeocin enters a cell, the Cu2+ is reduced to Cu+ and then removed. Subsequently, Zeocin becomes activated and can then bind and cleave DNA. However, the mechanism of action is not yet fully understood.

Usage
Zeocin and other related chemicals in the bleomycin family of compounds are primarily used in molecular biology as an antibiotic, especially for the selection of eukaryotic cell lines when used in conjunction with vectors containing a selectable marker for Zeocin resistance. Zeocin is considerably cheaper than phleomycin, works better in minimal media, and is therefore often used preferentially in studies.

Resistance to Zeocin is conferred by the product of the Sh ble gene first isolated from Streptoalloteichus hindustanus.  The Sh ble gene product binds the antibiotic in a one-to-one ratio so it can no longer cause cleavage of DNA.  This resistance gene is used as a selectable marker in some cloning and expression vectors where Zeocin is used as the antibiotic for selection.

Plasmids with Zeocin Resistance
pFUSE-Fc plasmid

pUNO1-Sh ble

pSELECT-zeo

pSELECT-GFPzeo

References

External links
 

Glycopeptide antibiotics
Eukaryotic selection compounds